Rubus obsessus is a rare North American species of flowering plants in the rose family. It is found only in the States of New York and Connecticut in the northeastern United States.

The genetics of Rubus is extremely complex, so that it is difficult to decide on which groups should be recognized as species. There are many rare species with limited ranges such as this. Further study is suggested to clarify the taxonomy.

References

obsessus
Plants described in 1943
Flora of Connecticut
Flora of New York (state)
Flora without expected TNC conservation status